Swingin' with Raymond is the seventh studio album by anarchist punk band Chumbawamba. The album cover features a photograph of Raymond Mills.

Musical style
The first half (tracks 1–6), entitled "Love It", features folk-styled love songs, sung by Lou Watts and featuring acoustic guitars and violin; Chris Nickson, an Allmusic critic, described the first half of the album as "ironic," commenting that the songs are "about the love of ideas -- even love itself becomes an idea." The second half (tracks 7–13), entitled "Hate It", features the other vocalists, faster rhythms, trumpet and louder guitars; Nickson felt that the second half contained "strong melodies and choruses." To complement the disparity between the two halves, the cover features a man on the album with "LOVE" and "HATE" tattooed on his knuckles. Some versions of the LP featured two separate discs, one for each part.

Critical reception
The album was met with mixed to positive reviews from critics. AllMusic's Chris Nickson felt that, although the instrumentation occasionally overpowers the lyrics, the album as a whole is artistically successful, concluding that "once again, pop meets politics and, as has to be the case with any good anarchist collective, the politics win -- but you can still think and dance while you listen."

Chart performance
The album was less successful in the UK than its predecessor, Anarchy, which had entered the top 40. Swingin' with Raymond peaked at number 70 on the UK Albums Chart, spending only one week on the tally.

Track listing 
All tracks are written by Chumbawamba.

Personnel
 Lou Watts
 Harry Hamer
 Paul Greco
 Boff Whalley
 Dunstan Bruce
 Mavis Dillon
 Danbert Nobacon
 Alice Nutter
 Dee Scholey – Violin on love songs
 Simon Commonknowledge – Extra vocals on "Salome"
 Babs Fox st The FFRWD – Live tape in middle of "Salome"

Charts

References

Chumbawamba albums
1995 albums
One Little Independent Records albums